Derek James Robertson was an Australian politician who represented the South Australian House of Assembly seat of Bright for the Labor Party from 1985 to 1989.

References

Members of the South Australian House of Assembly
Year of birth missing (living people)
Living people
Australian Labor Party members of the Parliament of South Australia